Liolaemus cristiani is a species of lizard in the family  Liolaemidae. The species is native to Chile.

Etymology
The specific name, cristiani, is in honor of Cristián Navarro, son of José Navarro.

Geographic range
L. cristiani is endemic to Maule Region, Chile.

Habitat

Diet
L. cristiani is omnivorous, preying upon insects and eating plant material.

Reproduction
L. cristiani is viviparous.

Taxonomy
L. cristiani is a member of the neuquensis species group of Liolaemus.

References

Further reading
Demangel D (2016). Reptiles del Centro Sur de Chile: Guía de Campo. Concepción, Chile: Corporación Chilena de la Madera (CORMA). 187 pp. . (Liolaemus cristiani, pp. 79–80). (in Spanish).
Núñez, Herman; Navarro, José; Loyola, José (1991). "Liolaemus maldonadae y Liolaemus cristiani, dos especies nuevas de lagartijas para Chile (Reptilia, Squamata)". Boletin Museo Nacional de Historia Natural, Santiago de Chile 42: 79–88. ("Liolaemus cristiani Navarro, Núñez & Loyola", new species, pp. 84–86, Figure 4). (in Spanish).

cristiani
Reptiles described in 1991
Reptiles of Chile
Endemic fauna of Chile